Louis Dantin was the pen name of Eugène Seers (November 28, 1865 – January 17, 1945), a Canadian writer and editor from Quebec. He is historically most noted as the original editor and publisher of the poetry of Émile Nelligan, although he also published numerous works as a poet, novelist and essayist in his own right.

Originally from Beauharnois, Quebec, he studied at the Collège de Montréal and later attended seminary to become a Roman Catholic priest. Associated with the Congregation of the Blessed Sacrament, he wrote religious poetry and short stories during this era. He was later associated with the École littéraire de Montréal, becoming acquainted there with writers such as Nelligan and Arthur de Bussières. He subsequently left the priesthood in 1903, marrying Clotilde Lacroix and moving to Boston, Massachusetts, where he worked as a printer for Harvard University Press. He resided in Boston for the remainder of his life, although he continued to publish French language literary work in Quebec. Most of his published work was as an essayist and critic, including volumes such as Poètes de l'Amérique française (1928) and Gloses critiques (1931), although he also published a volume of poetry (Le Coffret de Crusoé, 1932) and a posthumous novel (Les Enfances de Fanny, 1951). Several volumes of his correspondence with other Quebec writers were also published, as well as several posthumous volumes of poetry from his archives.

Two writers, Claude-Henri Grignon in his 1936 Les Pamphlets de Valdombre and Yvette Francoli in her 2013 Le Naufragé du Vaisseau d'or, have alleged that Dantin was the actual author of most of the poetry credited to Nelligan. Dantin denied Grignon's claims in several of his letters to other writers. In 2016, the University of Ottawa's literary journal @nalyses published an article by Annette Hayward and Christian Vandendorpe which rejected the claim, based on textual comparisons of the poetry credited to Nelligan with the writings of Dantin. In 2021, Pierre Hébert arrives at the same conclusion in his biochronique of the writer.

Works
 1928: Poètes de l'Amérique française
 1930: La Vie en rêve
 1930: Chanson javanaise
 1930: Le Mouvement littéraire dans les Cantons de l'Est
 1931: Gloses critiques
 1932: Le Coffret de Crusoé
 1932: Chanson intellectuelle
 1936: Contes de Noël
 1937: Je me souviens
 1951: Les Enfances de Fanny
 1962: Poèmes d'outre-tombe
 1963: Un Manuscrit retrouvé à Kor-El-Fantin
 1963: Les Sentiments d'un père affectueux
 2000: L'Abîme hospitalier
 2002: Essais critiques
 2003: La triste histoire de Li-Hung Fong et autres poèmes

References

1865 births
1945 deaths
20th-century Canadian novelists
20th-century Canadian poets
20th-century Canadian male writers
20th-century Canadian short story writers
Canadian novelists in French
Canadian poets in French
Canadian short story writers in French
Canadian non-fiction writers in French
Canadian editors
Canadian literary critics
Writers from Quebec
People from Beauharnois, Quebec
20th-century Canadian essayists
Canadian male poets
Canadian male novelists
Canadian male short story writers
Canadian male essayists